Paśmiechy  is a village in the administrative district of Gmina Kazimierza Wielka, within Kazimierza County, Świętokrzyskie Voivodeship, in south-central Poland. As of 2011, the village had 112 males and 99 females, for a total population of 211 people.

References

Villages in Kazimierza County